Sonia Viveros (2 September 1949 – 22 September 2003) was  one of the most important actresses on Chilean television. She was born in Santiago, Chile and died in La Serena. She distinguished herself with roles in the telenovelas La Madrastra, La Torre 10 and Marta a las Ocho.

Education and career
Viveros debuted in soap opera at age 17, becoming the youngest, most popular and talented actress of the time. At 9 she began working in radio and three years later on television.

Although she received no formal education in drama school, her innate talent and professionalism led her to acting on television. Her first TV series was El Litre 4916 (1967), in which she played the role of Carmencha.

She played a variety of roles in which her beauty, versatility and interpretive strength were her most noted highlights on Chilean screens, becoming well known and loved by the audience. Fame and recognition came in 1981 with the TV series La Madrastra (telenovela, 1981). She also participated in other television series like La represa and the comedy Juani en Sociedad.

Her role as villain in the TV series La Torre 10 as Telma Bernard is one of her most memorable performances.

Her role as the beautiful and proud Leonor Encina in the series Martín Rivas with Alejandro Cohen is perhaps one of her best performances for the cameras. Sonia Viveros along with this actor formed a highly ranked television couple.

Personal life and death
Sonia married three times and they were of a short duration. One of her spouses was the producer Óscar Rodríguez. None of her marriages produced children (she was pregnant fourteen times) as she suffered from spontaneous abortion. She decided to adopt two children: Camilo José Tomás and Javiera Esperanza on whom she poured all the attention she could give.

Her last marriage was to Professor Leopoldo Segovia, from La Serena whom she met while filming the TV series called Borrón y Cuenta Nueva (Clean Slate) and she settled in La Serena.

In 1985 she was diagnosed with lupus, a degenerative disease of the immune system which in her case seriously affected her cerebral vessels. Her older sister had died of a brain tumor, so it was not as a result of family history.

Filmography

Series
Más que amigos (Canal 13 - 2002) as Gabriela.

Television appearances
De Pe a Pa (2003)
Sonia Viveros with Alejandro Cohen in La Represa (1984).

External links
Sonia Viveros on TVN
Terminó la agonía de Sonia Viveros (Sonia Viveros agony has ended)
Sonia Viveros con muerte cerebral (Sonia Viveros with brain death)
Galería El Recuerdo a Sonia Viveros (El Recuerdo Gallery in memory of Sonia Viveros)
Sonia Viveros quiere vivir (Sonia Viveros wants to live)
Sonia Viveros: Su lucha por la vida (Sonia Viveros: Her fight for life)
Hechos 2003: Grandes Pérdidas (Great losses)

1949 births
2003 deaths
People from Santiago
Chilean actresses
Chilean telenovela actresses
Deaths from lupus